The Music I Like to Play Vol. 4, subtitled Soul Eyes, is a solo album by pianist Tete Montoliu recorded in 1990 and released on the Italian Soul Note label.

Reception

Ken Dryden of AllMusic states, "Mixing standards, swing, bop, and hard bop compositions, Montoliu consistently comes up with imaginative treatments. ... Although Montoliu would record several additional CDs after this session, this is easily one of his most essential releases".

Track listing
 "Bluesology" (Milt Jackson) – 4:16
 "Sophisticated Lady" (Duke Ellington, Irving Mills, Mitchell Parish) – 7:12
 "The Way You Look Tonight" (Jerome Kern, Dorothy Fields) – 5:13
 "Soul Eyes" (Mal Waldron) – 8:15
 "All the Things You Are" (Kern, Oscar Hammerstein II) – 4:13
 "Nancy (with the Laughing Face)" (Jimmy Van Heusen, Phil Silvers) – 5:28
 "Fair Weather" (Benny Golson) – 4:18
 "If I Should Lose You" (Ralph Rainger, Leo Robin) – 5:22
 "Up Jumped Spring" (Freddie Hubbard) – 4:43

Personnel
Tete Montoliu – piano

References

Tete Montoliu albums
1992 albums
Black Saint/Soul Note albums
Solo piano jazz albums